Varsinaissuomalainen osakunta (VSO) is one of the 15 student nations at the University of Helsinki, Finnish-speaking, established in 1906.

References

External links